Quỳnh Lưu is a rural district of Nghệ An province, in the North Central Coast region of Vietnam. As of 2003 the district had a population of 353,650. The district covers an area of 609 km2. The district capital lies at Cầu Giát.

References

Districts of Nghệ An province